Jari Jari language, sometimes spelled Yati Yati, Yerreyerre or other variants, may refer to:

 Wadi Wadi, an extinct Australian language once spoken in New South Wales
 Keramin language, an extinct Australian language once spoken in New South Wales